Edward James Conlin (September 2, 1933 – September 21, 2012) was an American basketball player and coach.

A 6'5" guard/forward from Fordham University, Conlin played in the National Basketball Association from 1955 to 1962 as a member of the Syracuse Nationals, Detroit Pistons, and Philadelphia Warriors.  He averaged 10.1 points per game in his NBA career.

Conlin later coached men's basketball at Fordham University.

Conlin died on September 21, 2012.

See also
 List of NCAA Division I men's basketball season rebounding leaders
 List of NCAA Division I men's basketball career rebounding leaders

References

External links
 

1933 births
2012 deaths
All-American college men's basketball players
American men's basketball players
Basketball coaches from New York (state)
Basketball players from New York City
Detroit Pistons players
Fordham Rams men's basketball coaches
Fordham Rams men's basketball players
Philadelphia Warriors players
Shooting guards
Small forwards
Sportspeople from Brooklyn
Syracuse Nationals draft picks
Syracuse Nationals players